Marco De Filippo (born 2 September 1990) is an Italian ice hockey player for SG Cortina and the Italian national team.

He represented Italy at the 2019 IIHF World Championship.

References

External links

1990 births
Living people
Brown Bears men's ice hockey players
Italian expatriate ice hockey people
Italian expatriate sportspeople in the United States
Italian ice hockey goaltenders
Louisiana IceGators (SPHL) players
SG Cortina players